Sweet Revenge generally refers to:
 Revenge, retaliation against a person or group in response to a wrongdoing

Sweet Revenge may also refer to:

Film and television
 Sweet Revenge (1921 film), a film starring Hoot Gibson
 Sweet Revenge (1976 film), a film starring Sam Waterston
 Sweet Revenge (1984 film), an American television film starring Alec Baldwin
 Sweet Revenge (1987 film), an action adventure starring Nancy Allen
 Sweet Revenge (1990 film), a film starring Rosanna Arquette
 Sweet Revenge (1998 film), a film starring Sam Neill and Helena Bonham Carter
 Sweet Revenge (2001 film), a British television film, broadcast in two parts
 Sweet Revenge (2007 film) (Gei sun yan), a Hong Kong film starring Nick Cheung
 Sweet Revenge (British TV series), a 2001 British television series
 Sweet Revenge (South Korean TV series), a 2017 South Korean web series
 Sweet Revenge 2, a 2018 South Korean television series

Music 
 Sweet Revenge (2000), an album by Bangs
 Sweet Revenge (Generation X album)
 Sweet Revenge (David Johansen album), and the title song
 Sweet Revenge (John Prine album), and the title song
 Sweet Revenge (Amanda Lear album), 1978 by West German label Ariola Records
 Sweet Revenge (Ryuichi Sakamoto album), 1994
 "Sweet Revenge", a song by Motörhead from Bomber
 "Sweet Revenge", a song by The 101ers

Other uses
 Sweet Revenge (liqueur), a strawberry and citrus flavoured liqueur
 Sweet Revenge, a play by Francis Durbridge
 Sweet Revenge: The Intimate Life of Simon Cowell, a 2012 biography of Simon Cowell by Tom Bower